Jraber (also Romanized as Dzhraber and Djraber; formerly, Nikolayevka) is a town in the Kotayk Province of Armenia. The village has a Kurdish minority (including Yazidis).

See also 
Kotayk Province

References 

Populated places in Kotayk Province
Kurdish settlements in Armenia
Yazidi populated places in Armenia